Les Luthiers – (volumen 3), album released in October, 1973.

Track listing

Side one
 "Voglio entrare per la finestra" (lyrics: Marcos Mundstock; music & conduction: Carlos López Puccio)
 "Miss Lilly Higgins sings shimmy in Mississippi's spring" (lyrics: Marcos Mundstock; music: Ernesto Acher)
 "Ya el sol se asomaba en el poniente" (lyrics: Les Luthiers; music: Gerardo Masana & Jorge Maronna)

Side two
 "La Bossa Nostra" (lyrics: Agustín Cuzzani; music: Ernesto Acher, Carlos Núñez Cortés & Jorge Maronna)
 "Romanza escocesa sin palabras" (music: Carlos Núñez Cortés)
 "Suite de los noticieros cinematográficos" (libretto: Marcos Mundstock; music: Carlos Núñez Cortés & Jorge Maronna)
 "Fe de erratas"

Les Luthiers albums
1973 albums